Cambroon is a rural locality in the Sunshine Coast Region, Queensland, Australia. In the  Cambroon had a population of 219 people.

Geography
Cambroon is located on the Mary River. It is on the Maleny-Kenilworth Road. It is situated about 98 km away from Brisbane.

History
Cambroon takes its name from the pastoral run of the same name, which was established in 1855 by J. D. MacTaggart. The name of the pastoral run is believed to be the name of an Aboriginal leader at the time of first contact.

In 1887,  of land were resumed from the Cambroon pastoral run for the establishment of small farms. The land was offered for selection on 17 April 1887.

Cambroon Provisional School opened on 5 February 1923 and became Cambroon State School on 1 December 1924. The school closed in May 1944.

In the 2011 census, Cambroon had a population of 373 people. The locality had a population density of around five persons per square kilometre. Almost all the people living in Cambroon speak English, and most people are married as well.

In the  Cambroon had a population of 219 people.

References

Suburbs of the Sunshine Coast Region
Localities in Queensland